Kalyanpur is a town in Barmer district, Jodhpur division, Rajasthan. Kalyanpur's population is around 5274.

References 

Cities and towns in Barmer district